Ivan Mikolutsky (born 3 January 1960) is a Belarusian former swimmer. He competed in two events at the 1976 Summer Olympics representing the Soviet Union.

References

External links
 

1960 births
Living people
Belarusian male swimmers
Olympic swimmers of the Soviet Union
Swimmers at the 1976 Summer Olympics
People from Mogilev
Soviet male swimmers
Sportspeople from Mogilev Region